Chelinda Airport  is an airport serving Chelinda, a village in the Northern Region of Malawi.

See also

Transport in Malawi
List of airports in Malawi

References

External links
OpenStreetMap - Chelinda
OurAirports - Chelinda Airport
FallingRain - Chelinda Airport

Airports in Malawi